Helena Elizabeth Anne Michell is an Australian-born English actress.

She is the daughter of the actors Keith Michell and Jeanette Sterke. Helena was born in Australia in 1963, but moved to England at an early age.

She began her career as a child in the film drama Moments with her parents and her brother, Paul. After three years training at the Bristol Old Vic Theatre School she secured a part in 1986 in the BBC television sitcom Brush Strokes.

Early film work included parts in Prick Up Your Ears, and alongside her father in The Deceivers (1988).

Television parts came with the Agatha Christie’s Miss Marple episode "At Bertram's Hotel" (1987), starring Joan Hickson, and in the LWT television series Piece of Cake the following year.

Michell had numerous television roles in the 1990s, including Jeeves and Wooster and Agatha Christie's Poirot “The Theft of the Royal Ruby” (1990),  a pivotal role in the television version of P.D. James' Inspector Dalgleish story Devices and Desires (1991), Sharpe's Enemy (1994) when she played the part of Sarah Dubreton, the television adaptation of Ruth Rendell's Heartstones and also in The Bill in 1996.

This was interspersed with stage parts in mainly children's theatre, and she has appeared with her parents at Chichester in 1997.

Michell is married to the English playwright Simon David Eden and together they have a daughter called Millie. She continues her theatre work largely through their production company, Shiny Pin Productions, and as an acting coach. She makes occasional appearances on television.  Her last notable large screen part was as Sheila in the romantic comedy Little Box of Sweets in 2007.

References

External links 
 helenamichell.com
 

English film actresses
Living people
1963 births
Australian emigrants to England
English television actresses
English stage actresses
20th-century English actresses
21st-century English actresses